A Sister to Assist 'Er is a 1922 British silent comedy film directed by George Dewhurst and starring Mary Brough, Polly Emery and Muriel Aked. It was based on the play  A Sister to Assist 'Er by John le Breton.

Cast
 Mary Brough ...  Mrs. Millie May 
 Polly Emery ...  Mrs. Mull 
 Muriel Aked ...  Mrs. Crawley 
 John MacAndrews ... Fishmonger

References

External links

1922 films
British silent feature films
British comedy films
Films directed by George Dewhurst
British films based on plays
British black-and-white films
1922 comedy films
1920s English-language films
1920s British films
Silent comedy films